The World Group was the highest level of Davis Cup competition in 1981. It was the first edition of the newly-formed 16-team World Group and a move to a tiered system including promotion and relegation. The original 16 teams to compete were chosen through the previous year's results, with teams that reached the 1980 Zonal semifinals chosen to compete in the inaugural bracket. The first-round losers would play in the Davis Cup World Group Relegation Play-offs, with the four losers relegated to their respective Zonal competitions the following year and replaced by the four winners of the current year's Zonal competitions.

Czechoslovakia were the defending champions, but were eliminated in the quarterfinals.

The United States won the title, defeating Argentina in the final, 3–1. The final was held at the Riverfront Coliseum in Cincinnati, Ohio, United States from 11 to 13 December. It was the US team's 27th Davis Cup title overall.

Participating teams

Draw

First round

West Germany vs. Argentina

Romania vs. Brazil

Great Britain vs. Italy

South Korea vs. New Zealand

Japan vs. Sweden

France vs. Australia

Switzerland vs. Czechoslovakia

United States vs. Mexico

Quarterfinals

Romania vs. Argentina

New Zealand vs. Great Britain

Sweden vs. Australia

United States vs. Czechoslovakia

Semifinals

Argentina vs. Great Britain

United States vs. Australia

Final

United States vs. Argentina

Relegation play-offs
The first-round losers played in the Relegation Play-offs. The winners of the play-offs advanced to the 1982 Davis Cup World Group, and the losers were relegated to their respective Zonal Regions.

Results summary
Date: 2–4 October

Brazil vs. West Germany

Italy vs. South Korea

France vs. Japan

Mexico vs. Switzerland

References

External links
Davis Cup official website

World Group
Davis Cup World Group
Davis Cup